Céline Van Severen (born 17 September 1993) is a Belgian former professional racing cyclist. She competed in the 2013 UCI women's road race in Florence. In 2013, Van Severen finished tenth in the Belgium Tour, and in 2015, she finished tenth in the Novilon EDR Cup.

See also
 2012 Sengers Ladies Cycling Team season

References

External links

1993 births
Living people
Belgian female cyclists
People from Tielt
Cyclists from West Flanders